Manglaur Riyasat  is a town with municipal board in Haridwar district in the Indian state of Uttarakhand. Pin code of Manglaur is 247656. Manglaur is located on national highway-58 (Delhi–Haridwar). It is 175 km away from Delhi and about 10 km from Roorkee.

At the time of the British it used to be a tehsil, Tehseel wali Masjid is still present there. And middle school building near Masjid used to Kachhari work. There was a Qila also the walls of which still exist in Shah Vilayat Masjid and that is a residential area now.

The current chairman of Manglaur is Dilshad Ahmad.

History 
Manglaur is an old place of North India which has its own recognition. At one side, it has a matter of pride being a historical place and on the other hand, it bears such good people who are owners of unlimited assets. History is witness that its name is on the basis of its bearer whose name was Mangal Sen. For a long time it was the capital of the king Mangal Sen whose symbol is present even today in this town. There is also an evidence from Aaine Akbar (author Abul Fajal), too, that it was a historical place.

Manglaur is a historical town where a fort made of brick is present which was built at the time of King Vikramaditya. During the medieval Indian period, Manglaur was mainly under the control of Brahmins and Goojars.

At the time of King Vikramaditya (380–415 A.D), Mangal Sen had built this fort. One portion of the wall of that fort is safe in corner of the shrine of Shah Vilayat. The width of this wall is 12 ft. And inside this surrounding there is a Masjid present built by Gyasuddeen Balban whose kutba is fitted in the wall of the Masjid. From Mangal Sen to British Rule, Manglaur was a tehsil.

Most of the time Manglaur was independent and it saw many rises and falls but for a short while during British rule, it become a far-east region of Punjab but was then later given to the United Provinces of British India. One time also came when it was declared a district but British rule took back its status of district and converted it back into a tehsil and later on the state of tehsil was also taken back and made Roorkee the tehsil.

Manglaur is listed in the Ain-i-Akbari as a pargana under the sarkar of Saharanpur, producing a revenue of 2,350,311 dams for the imperial treasury and supplying a force of 300 infantry and 40 cavalry. Its brick fort is also mentioned.

The building which was the offices of tehsil at that time was converted into 'Middle Oriental School’. This building had been famous by name of middle school after independence.

At present there is a Masjid nearby this school which is known as "tehseel wali masjid". And where was the main center of rule it is known as the name of Quila. Which is surrounded by roads and markets. After seeing this structure it can be said there was a trench around this quila by four sides for enemies. So that enemies could not reach inside Quila.

Presently the Fort is converted into Mohalla Quila which is surrounded by following roads, Nagar Palika Chowk to Sarrafa Bazar road, Main Market to Haidri Chowk road, then mohalla malakpura to Nagar Palika Parishad road.

At that time there was very less population outside town which is known as by the name of different Mohallas. These Mohallas have old buildings present still today. As Mohalla Lal Bag (Lal Bara), Jain Gali, kathaira have some old building which are witness of it historical.

Manglaur Census2011 -

Entry of Muslims 
The Turušhka ruler Sultan Sebüktegin conquered Manglaur after he defeated the king of the Indus River region, who was known as Anandapala. Abu-Abbas bin Ahmad Asfar Aayni was Sebüktegin's minister at that time. At that time, Manglaur was an independent state. Its area was 5000 miles at that time. It was conquered and briefly held by Sebüktegin but wasn't held for long as Sebüktegin had to go back to Afghanistan causing Manglaur to fall back into the hands of native Indian rulers as soon as Sebüktegin went back to Khorasan.

At the time of Sultan Mahmud Ghaznavi, the Farooqi family came in Manglaur, who founded a Madrassa there for the education of Muslims. In 1056 AD, a Muslim missionary named Sulaiman Gyasudeen Gauri brought the generation of Amirul Momineen Hasan to Manglaur for further education of the Muslims.

At that time it was known as Dawaba Manglaur, Bhosak Pura Mangal Sen. There was a big factory (karkhana) of islah saji. Hasni was good in islah Saji and kamaan saji, Today they are known as kamangarana.

Maulana Sheikh Jamaluddin Gaznavi Mijaz Sheikh Ahmad Chisti is from the Hasani generation whose grave is present in Mohalla Malakpura at the bank of Jamaal Pond. Today, this pond is known as Jamaal Garha. In 17th century, a Sufi saint named Shah Abdul Ghafoor Kardatani came in Manglaur and died here teaching Islam to the locals. His shrine was built by Gyasudeen Balban after his death.

In 1857, when the Great Indian Rebellion had started against the rule of the British, many Muslims of Manglaur joined the rebellion. They attacked many British Army outposts in and around the town of Manglaur. The Muslims in this region played a vital role during the rebellion fighting against British rule. After the rebellion was over, a Madrassa named Jamiya Arbiya Al Muslimeen was established in Manglaur. During British rule until 1947, it was an important learning and education centre for Muslims all over British India. After the Partition of India in 1947, the town became a part of Uttarakhand state in India and some Muslims fled to Delhi to board the refugee trains heading to the newly-created nation of Pakistan but the majority of Muslims surprisingly stayed in India. Today, the Muslims are a well established community in this town and the town is also the only majority Muslim region in the state of Uttarakhand.

Notable people  
Muhammad Nizamuddin, Indian politician from Uttarakhand and a three term member of the Uttarakhand Legislative Assembly
Tufail Ahmad Manglori, Indian Muslim scholar

Demographics 

The Manglaur Nagar Palika Parishad has population of 52,971 of which 27,761 are males while 25,210 are females as per report released by Census India 2011.
Population of Children with age of 0-6 is 8240 which is 15.56 % of total population of Manglaur (NPP). In Manglaur Nagar Palika Parishad, Female Sex Ratio is of 908 against state average of 963. Moreover Child Sex Ratio in Manglaur is around 931 compared to Uttarakhand state average of 890. Literacy rate of Manglaur city is 59.04 % lower than state average of 78.82 %. In Manglaur, Male literacy is around 64.12 % while female literacy rate is 53.43 %.

References

External links
 Official website of Manglaur

Cities and towns in Haridwar district